The Punchiná Dam is an embankment dam on the Guatapé River  east of San Carlos in Antioquia Department, Colombia. The dam creates Punchiná Reservoir which is part of the  San Carlos Hydroelectric Power Plant. The power plant was completed in two  stages, the first was completed in 1984 and the second in 1987. It is the largest power station in Colombia.

Background
The project was initiated by Interconexion Electrica S.A. in 1973 and appraised in 1978. In May 1978, a World Bank loan was approved to help fund the dam and both stages of the power plant. Construction began in 1979, the dam was completed in 1983 and the last generator of stage one was operational in 1984. Stage two's final generator was operational in December 1987. The commissioning of stage two was originally slated for 1984 and stage one for 1983 but was delayed due to financial problems and redesigns. The total cost of stage one was US$443.7 million and stage two US$166.3 million.

Design and operation

Punchiná Reservoir

San Carlos Hydroelectric Power Plant
Each tower provides water to a respective stage of the power plant via tunnels. Adjacent to the power house is another cavern that holds the transformers and is of similar dimensions. Once the water reaches the power house, each tunnel supplies the four  Pelton turbines of its respective stage.

See also

List of power stations in Colombia

References

Dams completed in 1984
Dams in Colombia
Earth-filled dams
Buildings and structures in Antioquia Department
Underground power stations